The New West Indian Guide (Nieuwe West-Indische Gids) is a peer-reviewed academic journal founded by the Royal Netherlands Institute of Southeast Asian and Caribbean Studies. It was established in 1919 by Herman Benjamins and covers research on anthropology, art, archaeology, economics, geography, history, political science, and linguistics of the Caribbean. Brill acquired the journal in 2012.

See also
 Open access in the Netherlands

References

External links
 New West Indian Guide at University of Florida Digital Collections

English-language journals
Publications established in 1919
Caribbean studies journals
Quarterly journals
Brill Publishers academic journals